The 2016 Singapore Community Shield (also known as the Great Eastern Community Shield for sponsorship reasons) was the 9th edition of the Singapore Community Shield held on 13 February 2016 at Jalan Besar Stadium, between the winners of the previous season's S.League and Singapore Cup competitions. The match was contested by 2015 Singapore Cup winners Albirex Niigata (S) and 2015 S.League champions DPMM FC.

Albirex Niigata (S) won the Shield for the first time after defeating DPMM FC 3–2.

Match

Details

See also
2016 S.League
2016 Singapore Cup
2016 Singapore League Cup

References

2016 in Singaporean football
2016 in Singapore